Raiganj Polytechnic , established in 1986,  is a government polytechnic located in Raiganj, Uttar Dinajpur district, West Bengal.

About college
This polytechnic is affiliated to the West Bengal State Council of Technical Education,  and recognised by AICTE, New Delhi. This polytechnic offers diploma courses in Automobile, Mechanical  and Civil Engineering.

See also

References

External links
 Admission to Polytechnics in West Bengal for Academic Session 2006-2007
http://www.raipolyedu.net.in/
Official website WBSCTE

Universities and colleges in Uttar Dinajpur district
Educational institutions established in 1986
1986 establishments in West Bengal
Technical universities and colleges in West Bengal